The Kansas City Blues play in the USA Rugby Division 1 competition, which is the highest level of amateur competition within USA Rugby. They also field a Division 2 team that offers new or inexperienced players a chance to learn the game while allowing them the opportunity to advance onto the D1 side. During the summer, the Blues also feature one of the most successful 7s programs in the country. The Blues have been a prominent team both regionally and nationally since their inception in 1966 and have a long history of success with many tournament and league championships and several National Championship and National Final Four appearances. The club has also produced many USA National Team players in both 15s and 7s and has hosted dozens of National Team players from other countries as well.

Today the Blues are made up of men from all walks of life and various athletic backgrounds. The Blues currently practice and play their home matches at the Children’s Mercy Training Facility at Swope Soccer Village and the D1 side competes in the Midwest Rugby Premiership against teams from Chicago, Minneapolis, Milwaukee, Cincinnati, Columbus & Iowa.

History
Based on a loose affiliation with both UMKC and Rockhurst College, the Kansas City Blues Rugby Club was established in 1966. Strides were taken to early on to develop a unique Club identity and culture by the founding members, and throughout the 1970s and 1980s, the Blues elevated their rugby knowledge and skill level to become one of the dominant teams in the United States. Throughout the first several decades of existence the Blues quickly became one of the dominant teams in the Midwest and quickly came to both regional and national notoriety with dozens upon dozens of tournament wins in prominent annual tournaments such as Aspen Ruggerfest, Heart of America, St. Louis Ruggerfest, etc. The club built a reputation for playing hard nosed rugby and always leaving it all on the field as well as always having a very close social connection with one another off the field. These attributes, along with a lot of winning, began to draw players from around the region.

In 1993, the Blues made their first run at a National Championship. After winning their league, the Blues advanced to Nationals and made a run to the Final Four where they ultimately lost. Then in 1997, the Blues were a founding member of the United States Rugby Super League (USA / 1997-2012). The Rugby Super League was the premier competition in the United States, made up of the top 14 teams in the nation, spanning from Boston and New York to San Diego and San Francisco. In the inaugural year the Blues made it to the Super League Final Four. Over the next ten years the Blues competed in RSL with several winning seasons. In 2007, the Blues made the decision to move back to Division 1 in order to restructure. The club successfully rebuilt and in 2012 the Blues became just the second club ever to send two separate teams to the National 15s playoffs round of 8 with a team competing in both the Division 1 and the Division 3 National Playoffs in the same year. Ultimately the Division 1 side would lose a close match (23-20) to Belmont Shore (California) who went on to win the National Championship. In 2014-2015, the Blues would win the Midwest Premiership League and once again punch their ticket to the Division 1 National Championship but again be bested in the round of eight in a close loss to Mystic River (Boston). Currently, the Blues field a Division 1 side that competes in the Midwest Rugby Premiership along with other Division 1 teams from Chicago, Minneapolis, Milwaukee, Columbus, Cincinnati, etc. as well as a Division 2 side that competes in the Heart of America League with other Division 2 teams from the more immediate region such as St. Louis, Omaha, etc. Since the Blues joined the Midwest Premiership in 2013-2014 the Blues have amassed an impressive D1 league record of 40-18 from 2013-2017.

 
In addition to success on the field in 15s, the Blues have also been considered a perennial national power in the game of 7s rugby as well. The Blues have qualified for and appeared at the 7s National Championship Tournament 14 times from 1990-2017. In those 14 appearances, the Blues have made the Final Four five times and have finished as National Runner Up three times but have never won the elusive National Championship. In 1993, the Blues made their first ever 7s Final Four and finished as the National Runner-Up with a close lose in the National Championship to New York Old Blue . Then 7 years later the Blues returned to the National Championship Match but fell just short again. In 2014, the Blues lost in the National Semi-Finals but won a spirited match against regional foe, rival Denver Barbarians, to take 3rd place. Most recently, in 2016, the Blues advanced to the 7s National Championship Match once again but unfortunately fell short again, this time to Utah. The Blues currently host one of the largest and most successful 7s programs in the country. In 2014, the Blues debuted their Sporting 7s Academy program which takes college aged players and places them in a special training program designed to increase their fitness, advance their rugby skills and improve their rugby acumen. Many summer weekends the Blues will field as many as three Blues sides as well as three Academy sides in various local and regional tournaments.

Match schedule and travel
The fall season consists of local and regional match play, highlighted by the annual trek to Aspen for the infamous Ruggerfest, as well as the start to the split-season West Division 1 North and Division 3 Heart of America League match play. The Club completes the League seasons in the early spring as playoffs loom, and throughout the fall and spring the Reserve side plays League matches against regional Div 3 clubs.

Representative and international players
The Blues have also sent a number of players to the United States national rugby union team, The Eagles, in both 7s and 15s rugby.  Establishing a tradition in the 1970s and 1980s with the Eagles through 

 Hal Edwards (Reserve, 1976–84)
 Vic Clark (Cougars, 1978)
 Kirk Miles (2 Eagles caps, 1982)
 Fred Paoli (20 Eagles caps, 1982–91)
 Frank Kennedy (USA 'A' 15s, 1988)
 Maika Sika (capped over 45 times for both the 7s and 15s Eagles sides)
 Tim Kluempers  (3 Eagles caps 2001)
 Doug Brown (Eagles 7s)
 Michael Skahan (Eagles 7s)
 Steve Robke (Eagles 7s)
 Ed Mills (15s ARC, 2015)
 Brodie Orth (3 Eagles Caps, 2016)
 Walt Elder (Eagles 7s, 2017)

In addition to this list of National Team Players the Blues have had dozens more players invited to USA Eagle Tryout camps, several dozen age grade USA Eagles and have recently had several players join the ranks of the first ever professional rugby league in the United States, Major League Rugby (MLR).

References

External links
 

American rugby union teams
Rugby union teams in Missouri
Rugby clubs established in 1966
Sports teams in the Kansas City metropolitan area